The Health Insurance Act of 1973 (Cth) was an Act of the Parliament of Australia, passed by the Labor Whitlam government, which introduced the Commonwealth of Australia's first universal healthcare scheme: Medibank. It was later amended under the Fraser government, whereinMedibank Private was established and the public healthcare scheme was progressively wound back. The Hawke government re-established the scheme under the name Medicare.

External links
 Health Insurance Act 1973 in the Federal Register of Legislation

1973 in Australian law
Acts of the Parliament of Australia
Health insurance in Australia